Concubine Yu (20 December 1816 – 24 September 1897), of the Han Chinese Plain White Banner Shang clan, was a consort of Daoguang Emperor.

Life

Family background
Concubine Yu was a member of Han Chinese Plain White Banner Shang clan.

 Father: Ruqing (如慶)
 Paternal grandfather: Fuhai (福海)
 Paternal grandmother: Lady Uya, a grand niece of Empress Xiaogongren
 One younger brother: Yingqi (英启)

Jiaqing era 
The future Concubine Yu was born on 20 December 1816.

Daoguang era 
Lady Shang entered the Forbidden City in 1834, and was given the title of "First Class Female Attendant Ling" (玲常在). She lived in Yanxi palace together with Noble Consort Cheng and Concubine Tian. In 1839, her palace maid Daniu was beaten forty times for stealing white silk satin. The palace maid also received a corporal punishment from her mistress for killing her cat. Later, Daniu was punished for stepping into a plate in 1840. That same year, lady Shang was demoted to "Second Class Female Attendant Shang" (尚答应). On 21 August 1845, the Palace of Prolonging Happiness burnt down, causing her to move out to Chuxiu palace.

Xianfeng era 
In 1850, Lady Shang was restored as "First Class Female Attendant Shang" (尚常在). In 1860, she was rewarded during the celebration of Chinese New Year together with dowager concubines. Unlike Imperial Noble Consort Zhuangshun, Noble Consort Cheng, Noble Consort Jia, Consort Xiang, and First Attendant Cai, she was left in the Forbidden City.

Tongzhi era 
In 1861, Lady Shang was promoted to "Noble Lady Shang" (尚貴人).

Guangxu era 
In 1874, Lady Shang was promoted to "Concubine Yu" (豫嫔; "yu" meaning “comfortable"). Concubine Yu died on 24 September 1897 at the age of eighty-one. She was longest living consort of the Daoguang Emperor. Her coffin was interred at Mu Mausoleum of the Western Qing tombs.

Titles  
 During the reign of the Jiaqing Emperor (r. 1796–1820):
 Lady Shang (from 20 December 1816)
 During the reign of the Daoguang Emperor (r. 1820–1850):
 First Class Female Attendant Ling (from 1834), seventh rank consort 
 Second Class Female Attendant Shang (from 1840), eighth rank consort 
 During the reign of the Xianfeng Emperor (r. 1850–1861):
 First Class Female Attendant Shang (from 1850), seventh rank consort 
 During the reign of the Tongzhi Emperor (r. 1861–1875):
 Noble Lady Shang (from 1861), sixth rank consort 
 During the reign of the Guangxu Emperor (r. 1875–1908):
 Concubine Yu (from 1874), fifth rank consort

See also
 Ranks of imperial consorts in China#Qing
 Royal and noble ranks of the Qing dynasty

References

1816 births
1897 deaths
Consorts of the Daoguang Emperor
19th-century Chinese women